Wesley Berg (born April 19, 1993 in Coquitlam, British Columbia, Canada) is a Canadian professional lacrosse player for the San Diego Seals of the National Lacrosse League (NLL) and the Chaos Lacrosse Club in the Premier Lacrosse League (PLL).

Junior and Major
Berg began his amateur career with the Coquitlam Adanacs Jr. A of the BC Junior A Lacrosse League in 2010. In his first season with the Adanacs, Berg finished with 42 points. Berg and the Adanacs went on to win the Minto Cup. In 2011, Berg finished first in the league in both goals (60) and points (114) and was awarded the Bill Dickinson Trophy as the league's scoring champion. Berg only appeared in 19 regular season games in the following three seasons putting up 98 points during this span.

Berg was drafted in the second round (17th overall) of the 2015 Major Series Lacrosse entry draft by the Oakville Rock. In 2016, Berg finished 9th in scoring with 52 points.

NCAA
Prior to joining the University of Denver Pioneers, Berg attended and played lacrosse at Charles Best Secondary School in  Coquitlam, British Columbia.

Playing for coach Bill Tierney at Denver, Berg started at midfield in his freshman season. He was named the Eastern College Athletic Conference (ECAC) Rookie of the Year after finishing the season tied for second on the team in goals (26) and fifth in points (37).

Moving to the attack position in his sophomore year, Berg helped the Pioneers earn their first No. 1 ranking in program history. He started in 17-of-19 games, leading the team in goals (56) and points (72).

In his junior season, Berg started in all 19 games and finished the season ranked first on the team in goals (48) and points (68).

In his senior season, Berg started in all 19 games and finished the season ranked first on the team in goals (58) and second in points (78). Berg tied for the program's second-most points in a season and broke his own program single-season goals record. Berg and the Pioneers won the 2015 NCAA Division I Men's Lacrosse Championship 10–5 against Maryland as Berg was awarded the Most Outstanding Player of the Tournament.

Denver was 56–14 in Berg's four years there, with three consecutive trips to the final four as well as one national title in his senior season.
Berg finished his college career as Denver's career leader in points (255) and goals (188). He also finished his career on a 38-game active point streak and scored 39 career NCAA Tournament goals, the second most in NCAA history.

MLL
Berg was drafted in the second round (15th overall) of the 2015 Major League Lacrosse Collegiate Draft by the Denver Outlaws. In his rookie season with the Outlaws, Berg appeared in only 2 games scoring his first career goal against the Ohio Machine on May 29, 2015. In 2016, Berg was fifth on the team in scoring with 22 points in 10 games. Berg made his first playoff appearance during the 2016 Major League Lacrosse Playoffs. He notably scored 3 goals in the 2016 MLL Championship game as the Denver Outlaws went on to win 19–18 over Ohio.

NLL
Berg was drafted in the first round (4th overall) of the 2015 NLL Entry Draft by the Calgary Roughnecks. In 2016, Berg was named the NLL Rookie of the Month for March, leading all NLL rookies in scoring with 20 points. Berg finished the 2016 NLL season as a NLL Rookie of the Year finalist, finishing the season with 67 points. In 2017, Berg ranked third on the Roughnecks and 14th overall in scoring.

Premier Lacrosse League
On October 22, 2018 it was announced that Berg was joining the Premier Lacrosse League for the summer 2019 season. On March 4, 2019 it was announced that Berg was joining the Chrome Lacrosse Club.

On May 3, 2021, Berg was traded from Waterdogs Lacrosse Club to Chaos Lacrosse Club along with a first round pick in the 2022 College Draft in exchange for goaltender Dillon Ward.

International
Berg was selected to play for Team Canada at the FIL 2014 World Lacrosse Championship in Denver, Colorado. On Saturday, July 19, 2014, Canada defeated the United States 8–5 to win gold. Berg played in all seven games, finishing the tournament with 5 goals and 7 points.

Statistics

NLL
Reference:

MLL
Reference:

PLL 
Reference:

References

1994 births
Living people
Canadian lacrosse players
Calgary Roughnecks players
Denver Outlaws players
Lacrosse people from British Columbia
People from Coquitlam
Premier Lacrosse League players
San Diego Seals players
Lacrosse forwards
Canadian expatriate lacrosse people in the United States
Competitors at the 2022 World Games
World Games gold medalists